Czechland Lake Recreation Area is a recreation area located 1 mile north of Prague, Saunders County, Nebraska. The park is owned and operated by the Lower Platte North Natural Resources District.

See also
 Bohemian Alps
 Lake Wanahoo

References

External links
 Map of Czechland Lake
 Image of Czechland Lake
 Czechland Lake ready for new season

Czech-American culture in Nebraska
Bodies of water of Saunders County, Nebraska
Parks in Nebraska
Protected areas of Saunders County, Nebraska
Lakes of Nebraska